Gymnosporangium yamadae is a plant pathogen that causes Japanese apple rust.

References

Fungal plant pathogens and diseases
Fungi described in 1904
Pucciniales